The Line 1 of Seville Metro connects the capital, Seville, with Mairena del Aljarafe, San Juan de Aznalfarache and Montequinto (Dos Hermanas).

Description 
Line 1 begins in Ciudad Expo (Mairena del Aljarafe), passing beneath the neighborhood, and arrives at the underground station of Calaveri. The line proceeds above ground to the higher portion of the neighborhood of San Juan de Aznalfarache. It continues its underground path through San Juan until arriving at the lower portion of the neighborhood. Next, the line passes above the highway SE-30 by way of a viaduct, and continues on ground level until the station of Blas Infante, located in Seville. From here the line passes underground through los Remedios (line 4, connection expected), Prado de San Sebastián (line 3, expected), San Bernardo (suburban trains connection), Nervión, 1º de Mayo (line 4, expected), Parque Amate, and Cocheras. After this segment, the line once again passes above ground and crosses above the highway SE-30 by way of viaduct before arriving at the station of Guadaira (still located in Seville, capital) which will be an interchange station with a suburban trains. The line extends above the surface towards the station of Pablo de Olavide and advances on the viaduct over the highway of Utrera before finally ending in the neighborhood of Montequinto, which has four stations. The last of these stations is an interchange station between the metro and tram networks. The line will not have a direct transfer with the line 2.

General characteristics 
Method of construction: Tunnel boring machine, cut and cover, and viaduct.
Average depth: .
Cost: Around €650 million.
Municipalities served: Four.
Districts spanned: Four. 
Population served: 227.974 approximately
Annual users: 14.000.000 approximately
Daily users: 39.000 approximately

Operation

Schedules 
The closing time corresponds to the departure of the last train beginning from any of the starting stations in order to proceed serving the people waiting in other stations along the line.

Segmentation 
In line 1 of the metro of Seville, the various rates are established according to the number of segment transfers that the user requires in order to travel from the original station to the final one. For this reason, the line is subdivided zones with different rates, which generally correspond with the borders of the municipalities of Seville and the rest of the metropolitan area through which the line runs. The stations of Blas Infante and Pablo de Olavide serve as the two nexuses between the three zones, and as such, any user moving from a zone to one of these two points does not pay the segment transfer fee.

Stations 

Seville Metro
Railway lines opened in 2010
Rapid transit lines in Spain